In physics, the Navier–Stokes equations are partial differential equations which describe the motion of viscous fluid substances, named after French engineer and physicist Claude-Louis Navier and Anglo-Irish physicist and mathematician George Gabriel Stokes.  They were developed over several decades of progressively building the theories, from 1822 (Navier) to 1842-1850 (Stokes).

The Navier–Stokes equations mathematically express momentum balance and conservation of mass for Newtonian fluids. They are sometimes accompanied by an equation of state relating pressure, temperature  and density. They arise from applying Isaac Newton's second law to fluid motion, together with the assumption that the stress in the fluid is the sum of a diffusing viscous term (proportional to the gradient of velocity) and a pressure term—hence describing viscous flow. The difference between them and the closely related Euler equations is that Navier–Stokes equations take viscosity into account while the Euler equations model only inviscid flow. As a result, the Navier–Stokes are a parabolic equation and therefore have better analytic properties, at the expense of having less mathematical structure (e.g. they are never completely integrable).

The Navier–Stokes equations are useful because they describe the physics of many phenomena of scientific and engineering interest. They may be used to model the weather, ocean currents, water flow in a pipe and air flow around a wing. The Navier–Stokes equations, in their full and simplified forms, help with the design of aircraft and cars, the study of blood flow, the design of power stations, the analysis of pollution, and many other things. Coupled with Maxwell's equations, they can be used to model and study magnetohydrodynamics.

The Navier–Stokes equations are also of great interest in a purely mathematical sense. Despite their wide range of practical uses, it has not yet been proven whether smooth solutions always exist in three dimensions—i.e., whether they are infinitely differentiable (or even just bounded) at all points in the domain. This is called the Navier–Stokes existence and smoothness problem. The Clay Mathematics Institute has called this one of the seven most important open problems in mathematics and has offered a US$1 million prize for a solution or a counterexample.

Flow velocity
The solution of the equations is a flow velocity. It is a vector field—to every point in a fluid, at any moment in a time interval, it gives a vector whose direction and magnitude are those of the velocity of the fluid at that point in space and at that moment in time. It is usually studied in three spatial dimensions and one time dimension, although two (spatial) dimensional and steady-state cases are often used as models, and higher-dimensional analogues are studied in both pure and applied mathematics. Once the velocity field is calculated, other quantities of interest such as pressure or temperature may be found using dynamical equations and relations. This is different from what one normally sees in classical mechanics, where solutions are typically trajectories of position of a particle or deflection of a continuum. Studying velocity instead of position makes more sense for a fluid, although for visualization purposes one can compute various trajectories. In particular, the streamlines of a vector field, interpreted as flow velocity, are the paths along which a massless fluid particle would travel. These paths are the integral curves whose derivative at each point is equal to the vector field, and they can represent visually the behavior of the vector field at a point in time.

General continuum equations

The Navier–Stokes momentum equation can be derived as a particular form of the Cauchy momentum equation, whose general convective form is

By setting the Cauchy stress tensor  to be the sum of a viscosity term  (the deviatoric stress) and a pressure term  (volumetric stress), we arrive at

where
  is the (mass) density,
  is the flow velocity,
  is the divergence,
  is the pressure,
  is time,
  is the deviatoric stress tensor, which has order 2,
  represents body accelerations acting on the continuum, for example gravity, inertial accelerations, electrostatic accelerations, and so on.

In this form, it is apparent that in the assumption of an inviscid fluid – no deviatoric stress – Cauchy equations reduce to the Euler equations.

Assuming conservation of mass we can use the mass continuity equation (or simply continuity equation),

to arrive at the conservation form of the equations of motion. This is often written:

where  is the outer product:

The left side of the equation describes acceleration, and may be composed of time-dependent and convective components (also the effects of non-inertial coordinates if present). The right side of the equation is in effect a summation of hydrostatic effects, the divergence of deviatoric stress and body forces (such as gravity).

All non-relativistic balance equations, such as the Navier–Stokes equations, can be derived by beginning with the Cauchy equations and specifying the stress tensor through a constitutive relation. By expressing the deviatoric (shear) stress tensor in terms of viscosity and the fluid velocity gradient, and assuming constant viscosity, the above Cauchy equations will lead to the Navier–Stokes equations below.

Convective acceleration

A significant feature of the Cauchy equation and consequently all other continuum equations (including Euler and Navier–Stokes) is the presence of convective acceleration: the effect of acceleration of a flow with respect to space. While individual fluid particles indeed experience time-dependent acceleration, the convective acceleration of the flow field is a spatial effect, one example being fluid speeding up in a nozzle.

Compressible flow

The compressible momentum Navier–Stokes equation results from the following assumptions on the Cauchy stress tensor:

the stress is Galilean invariant: it does not depend directly on the flow velocity, but only on spatial derivatives of the flow velocity. So the stress variable is the tensor gradient .
the stress is linear in this variable: , where  is the fourth-order tensor representing the constant of proportionality, called the viscosity or elasticity tensor, and : is the double-dot product.
the fluid is assumed to be isotropic, as with gases and simple liquids, and consequently  is an isotropic tensor; furthermore, since the stress tensor is symmetric, by Helmholtz decomposition it can be expressed in terms of two scalar Lamé parameters, the second viscosity  and the dynamic viscosity , as it is usual in linear elasticity:

So this decomposition can be explicitly defined as:

Since the trace of the rate-of-strain tensor in three dimensions is:

The trace of the stress tensor in three dimensions becomes:

So by alternatively decomposing the stress tensor into isotropic and deviatoric parts, as usual in fluid dynamics:

Introducing the bulk viscosity ,

we arrive to the linear constitutive equation in the form usually employed in thermal hydraulics:

Both second viscosity  and dynamic viscosity  need not be constant – in general, they depend on two thermodynamics variables if the fluid contains a single chemical species, say for example, pressure and temperature. Any equation that makes explicit one of these transport coefficient in the conservation variables is called an equation of state.

The most general of the Navier–Stokes equations become

Apart from its dependence of pressure and temperature, the second viscosity coefficient also depends on the process, that is to say, the second viscosity coefficient is not just a material property. For instance, in the case of a sound wave with a definitive frequency that alternatively compresses and expands a fluid element, the second viscosity coefficient depends on the frequency of the wave. This dependence is called the dispersion. In some cases, the second viscosity  can be assumed to be constant in which case, the effect of the volume viscosity  is that the mechanical pressure is not equivalent to the thermodynamic pressure: as demonstrated below.

However, this difference is usually neglected most of the time (that is whenever we are not dealing with processes such as sound absorption and attenuation of shock waves, where second viscosity coefficient becomes important) by explicitly assuming . The assumption of setting  is called as the Stokes hypothesis. The validity of Stokes hypothesis can be demonstrated for monoatomic gas both experimentally and from the kinetic theory,; for other gases and liquids, Stokes hypothesis is generally incorrect. With the Stokes hypothesis, the Navier–Stokes equations become

If the dynamic viscosity  is also assumed to be constant, the equations can be simplified further.

where  is the material derivative. The left-hand side changes in the conservation form of the Navier–Stokes momentum equation:

Bulk viscosity is assumed to be constant, otherwise it should not be taken out of the last derivative.  The convective acceleration term can also be written as

where the vector  is known as the Lamb vector.

Incompressible flow
The incompressible momentum Navier–Stokes equation results from the following assumptions on the Cauchy stress tensor:

the stress is Galilean invariant: it does not depend directly on the flow velocity, but only on spatial derivatives of the flow velocity. So the stress variable is the tensor gradient .
the fluid is assumed to be isotropic, as with gases and simple liquids, and consequently  is an isotropic tensor; furthermore, since the deviatoric stress tensor can be expressed in terms of the dynamic viscosity :

where

is the rate-of-strain tensor. So this decomposition can be made explicit as:

Dynamic viscosity  need not be constant – in incompressible flows it can depend on density and on pressure. Any equation that makes explicit one of these transport coefficient in the conservative variables is called an equation of state.

The divergence of the deviatoric stress is given by:

because  for an incompressible fluid.

Incompressibility rules out density and pressure waves like sound or shock waves, so this simplification is not useful if these phenomena are of interest. The incompressible flow assumption typically holds well with all fluids at low Mach numbers (say up to about Mach 0.3), such as for modelling air winds at normal temperatures. the incompressible Navier–Stokes equations are best visualized by dividing for the density:

If the density is constant throughout the fluid domain, or, in other words, if all fluid elements have the same density, then we have

where  is called the kinematic viscosity.

It is well worth observing the meaning of each term (compare to the Cauchy momentum equation):

The higher-order term, namely the shear stress divergence , has simply reduced to the vector Laplacian term . This Laplacian term can be interpreted as the difference between the velocity at a point and the mean velocity in a small surrounding volume. This implies that – for a Newtonian fluid – viscosity operates as a diffusion of momentum, in much the same way as the heat conduction. In fact neglecting the convection term, incompressible Navier–Stokes equations lead to a vector diffusion equation (namely Stokes equations), but in general the convection term is present, so incompressible Navier–Stokes equations belong to the class of convection–diffusion equations.

In the usual case of an external field being a conservative field:

by defining the hydraulic head:

one can finally condense the whole source in one term, arriving to the incompressible Navier–Stokes equation with conservative external field:

The incompressible Navier–Stokes equations with conservative external field is the fundamental equation of hydraulics. The domain for these equations is commonly a 3 or less dimensional Euclidean space, for which an orthogonal coordinate reference frame is usually set to explicit the system of scalar partial differential equations to be solved. In 3-dimensional orthogonal coordinate systems are 3: Cartesian, cylindrical, and spherical. Expressing the Navier–Stokes vector equation in Cartesian coordinates is quite straightforward and not much influenced by the number of dimensions of the euclidean space employed, and this is the case also for the first-order terms (like the variation and convection ones) also in non-cartesian orthogonal coordinate systems. But for the higher order terms (the two coming from the divergence of the deviatoric stress that distinguish Navier–Stokes equations from Euler equations) some tensor calculus is required for deducing an expression in non-cartesian orthogonal coordinate systems.

The incompressible Navier–Stokes equation is composite, the sum of two orthogonal equations,

This result follows from the Helmholtz theorem (also known as the fundamental theorem of vector calculus). The first equation is a pressureless governing equation for the velocity, while the second equation for the pressure is a functional of the velocity and is related to the pressure Poisson equation.

The explicit functional form of the projection operator in 3D is found from the Helmholtz Theorem:

with a similar structure in 2D. Thus the governing equation is an integro-differential equation similar to Coulomb and Biot–Savart law, not convenient for numerical computation.

An equivalent weak or variational form of the equation, proved to produce the same velocity solution as the Navier–Stokes equation, is given by,

for divergence-free test functions  satisfying appropriate boundary conditions. Here, the projections are accomplished by the orthogonality of the solenoidal and irrotational function spaces. The discrete form of this is eminently suited to finite element computation of divergence-free flow, as we shall see in the next section. There one will be able to address the question "How does one specify pressure-driven (Poiseuille) problems with a pressureless governing equation?".

The absence of pressure forces from the governing velocity equation demonstrates that the equation is not a dynamic one, but rather a kinematic equation where the divergence-free condition serves the role of a conservation equation. This all would seem to refute the frequent statements that the incompressible pressure enforces the divergence-free condition.

Weak form of the incompressible Navier–Stokes equations

Strong form
Consider the incompressible Navier–Stokes equations for a Newtonian fluid of constant density  in a domain

with boundary

being  and  portions of the boundary where respectively a Dirichlet and a Neumann boundary condition  is applied:

Let  be the dynamic viscosity of the fluid,  the second-order identity tensor and  the strain-rate tensor defined as: 

The first equation is the momentum balance equation, while the second represents the mass conservation, namely the continuity equation. 
Assuming constant dynamic viscosity, using the vectorial identity

and exploiting mass conservation, the divergence of the total stress tensor in the momentum equation can also be expressed as: 

Moreover, note that the Neumann boundary conditions can be rearranged as:

Weak form
In order to find the weak form of the Navier–Stokes equations, firstly, consider the momentum equation 

multiply it for a test function , defined in a suitable space , and integrate both members with respect to the domain :

Counter-integrating by parts the diffusive and the pressure terms and by using the Gauss' theorem: 

Using these relations, one gets: 

In the same fashion, the continuity equation is multiplied for a test function  belonging to a space  and integrated in the domain :

The space functions are chosen as follows: 

Considering that the test function  vanishes on the Dirichlet boundary and considering the Neumann condition, the integral on the boundary can be rearranged as: 

Having this in mind, the weak formulation of the Navier–Stokes equations is expressed as:

Discrete velocity
With partitioning of the problem domain and defining basis functions on the partitioned domain, the discrete form of the governing equation is

It is desirable to choose basis functions that reflect the essential feature of incompressible flow – the elements must be divergence-free. While the velocity is the variable of interest, the existence of the stream function or vector potential is necessary by the Helmholtz theorem. Further, to determine fluid flow in the absence of a pressure gradient, one can specify the difference of stream function values across a 2D channel, or the line integral of the tangential component of the vector potential around the channel in 3D, the flow being given by Stokes' theorem. Discussion will be restricted to 2D in the following.

We further restrict discussion to continuous Hermite finite elements which have at least first-derivative degrees-of-freedom. With this, one can draw a large number of candidate triangular and rectangular elements from the plate-bending literature. These elements have derivatives as components of the gradient. In 2D, the gradient and curl of a scalar are clearly orthogonal, given by the expressions,

Adopting continuous plate-bending elements, interchanging the derivative degrees-of-freedom and changing the sign of the appropriate one gives many families of stream function elements.

Taking the curl of the scalar stream function elements gives divergence-free velocity elements. The requirement that the stream function elements be continuous assures that the normal component of the velocity is continuous across element interfaces, all that is necessary for vanishing divergence on these interfaces.

Boundary conditions are simple to apply. The stream function is constant on no-flow surfaces, with no-slip velocity conditions on surfaces.
Stream function differences across open channels determine the flow. No boundary conditions are necessary on open boundaries, though consistent values may be used with some problems. These are all Dirichlet conditions.

The algebraic equations to be solved are simple to set up, but of course are non-linear, requiring iteration of the linearized equations.

Similar considerations apply to three-dimensions, but extension from 2D is not immediate because of the vector nature of the potential, and there exists no simple relation between the gradient and the curl as was the case in 2D.

Pressure recovery
Recovering pressure from the velocity field is easy. The discrete weak equation for the pressure gradient is,

where the test/weight functions are irrotational. Any conforming scalar finite element may be used. However, the pressure gradient field may also be of interest. In this case, one can use scalar Hermite elements for the pressure. For the test/weight functions  one would choose the irrotational vector elements obtained from the gradient of the pressure element.

Non-inertial frame of reference

The rotating frame of reference introduces some interesting pseudo-forces into the equations through the material derivative term. Consider a stationary inertial frame of reference  , and a non-inertial frame of reference , which is translating with velocity  and rotating with angular velocity  with respect to the stationary frame. The Navier–Stokes equation observed from the non-inertial frame then becomes

Other equations
The Navier–Stokes equations are strictly a statement of the balance of momentum. To fully describe fluid flow, more information is needed, how much depending on the assumptions made. This additional information may include boundary data (no-slip, capillary surface, etc.), conservation of mass, balance of energy, and/or an equation of state.

Continuity equation for incompressible fluid

Regardless of the flow assumptions, a statement of the conservation of mass is generally necessary. This is achieved through the mass continuity equation, given in its most general form as:

or, using the substantive derivative:

For incompressible fluid, density along the line of flow remains constant over time, 

Therefore divergence of velocity is always zero:

Stream function for incompressible 2D fluid
Taking the curl of the incompressible Navier–Stokes equation results in the elimination of pressure.

For incompressible flow, defining the stream function  through

results in mass continuity being unconditionally satisfied (given the stream function is continuous), and then incompressible Newtonian 2D momentum and mass conservation condense into one equation:

We can also express this compactly using the Jacobian determinant:

This single equation together with appropriate boundary conditions describes 2D fluid flow, taking only kinematic viscosity as a parameter. Note that the equation for creeping flow results when the left side is assumed zero.

In axisymmetric flow another stream function formulation, called the Stokes stream function, can be used to describe the velocity components of an incompressible flow with one scalar function.

The incompressible Navier–Stokes equation is a differential algebraic equation, having the inconvenient feature that there is no explicit mechanism for advancing the pressure in time. Consequently, much effort has been expended to eliminate the pressure from all or part of the computational process. The stream function formulation eliminates the pressure but only in two dimensions and at the expense of introducing higher derivatives and elimination of the velocity, which is the primary variable of interest.

Properties

Nonlinearity

The Navier–Stokes equations are nonlinear partial differential equations in the general case and so remain in almost every real situation. In some cases, such as one-dimensional flow and Stokes flow (or creeping flow), the equations can be simplified to linear equations. The nonlinearity makes most problems difficult or impossible to solve and is the main contributor to the turbulence that the equations model.

The nonlinearity is due to convective acceleration, which is an acceleration associated with the change in velocity over position. Hence, any convective flow, whether turbulent or not, will involve nonlinearity. An example of convective but laminar (nonturbulent) flow would be the passage of a viscous fluid (for example, oil) through a small converging nozzle. Such flows, whether exactly solvable or not, can often be thoroughly studied and understood.

Turbulence

Turbulence is the time-dependent chaotic behaviour seen in many fluid flows. It is generally believed that it is due to the inertia of the fluid as a whole: the culmination of time-dependent and convective acceleration; hence flows where inertial effects are small tend to be laminar (the Reynolds number quantifies how much the flow is affected by inertia). It is believed, though not known with certainty, that the Navier–Stokes equations describe turbulence properly.

The numerical solution of the Navier–Stokes equations for turbulent flow is extremely difficult, and due to the significantly different mixing-length scales that are involved in turbulent flow, the stable solution of this requires such a fine mesh resolution that the computational time becomes significantly infeasible for calculation or direct numerical simulation. Attempts to solve turbulent flow using a laminar solver typically result in a time-unsteady solution, which fails to converge appropriately. To counter this, time-averaged equations such as the Reynolds-averaged Navier–Stokes equations (RANS), supplemented with turbulence models, are used in practical computational fluid dynamics (CFD) applications when modeling turbulent flows. Some models include the Spalart–Allmaras, –, –, and SST models, which add a variety of additional equations to bring closure to the RANS equations. Large eddy simulation (LES) can also be used to solve these equations numerically. This approach is computationally more expensive—in time and in computer memory—than RANS, but produces better results because it explicitly resolves the larger turbulent scales.

Applicability

Together with supplemental equations (for example, conservation of mass) and well-formulated boundary conditions, the Navier–Stokes equations seem to model fluid motion accurately; even turbulent flows seem (on average) to agree with real world observations.

The Navier–Stokes equations assume that the fluid being studied is a continuum (it is infinitely divisible and not composed of particles such as atoms or molecules), and is not moving at relativistic velocities. At very small scales or under extreme conditions, real fluids made out of discrete molecules will produce results different from the continuous fluids modeled by the Navier–Stokes equations. For example, capillarity of internal layers in fluids appears for flow with high gradients.  For large Knudsen number of the problem, the Boltzmann equation may be a suitable replacement. 
Failing that, one may have to resort to molecular dynamics or various hybrid methods.

Another limitation is simply the complicated nature of the equations. Time-tested formulations exist for common fluid families, but the application of the Navier–Stokes equations to less common families tends to result in very complicated formulations and often to open research problems. For this reason, these equations are usually written for Newtonian fluids where the viscosity model is linear; truly general models for the flow of other kinds of fluids (such as blood) do not exist.

Application to specific problems
The Navier–Stokes equations, even when written explicitly for specific fluids, are rather generic in nature and their proper application to specific problems can be very diverse. This is partly because there is an enormous variety of problems that may be modeled, ranging from as simple as the distribution of static pressure to as complicated as multiphase flow driven by surface tension.

Generally, application to specific problems begins with some flow assumptions and initial/boundary condition formulation, this may be followed by scale analysis to further simplify the problem.

Parallel flow
Assume steady, parallel, one-dimensional, non-convective pressure-driven flow between parallel plates, the resulting scaled (dimensionless) boundary value problem is:

The boundary condition is the no slip condition. This problem is easily solved for the flow field:

From this point onward, more quantities of interest can be easily obtained, such as viscous drag force or net flow rate.

Radial flow
Difficulties may arise when the problem becomes slightly more complicated. A seemingly modest twist on the parallel flow above would be the radial flow between parallel plates; this involves convection and thus non-linearity. The velocity field may be represented by a function  that must satisfy:

This ordinary differential equation is what is obtained when the Navier–Stokes equations are written and the flow assumptions applied (additionally, the pressure gradient is solved for). The nonlinear term makes this a very difficult problem to solve analytically (a lengthy implicit solution may be found which involves elliptic integrals and roots of cubic polynomials). This is an example of flow assumptions losing their applicability, and an example of the difficulty in "high" Reynolds number flows.

Convection
A type of natural convection that can be described by the Navier–Stokes equation is the Rayleigh–Bénard convection. It is one of the most commonly studied convection phenomena because of its analytical and experimental accessibility.

Exact solutions of the Navier–Stokes equations
Some exact solutions to the Navier–Stokes equations exist. Examples of degenerate cases—with the non-linear terms in the Navier–Stokes equations equal to zero—are Poiseuille flow, Couette flow and the oscillatory Stokes boundary layer. But also, more interesting examples, solutions to the full non-linear equations, exist, such as Jeffery–Hamel flow, Von Kármán swirling flow, stagnation point flow, Landau–Squire jet, and Taylor–Green vortex.
Note that the existence of these exact solutions does not imply they are stable: turbulence may develop at higher Reynolds numbers.

Under additional assumptions, the component parts can be separated.

A three-dimensional steady-state vortex solution

A steady-state example with no singularities comes from considering the flow along the lines of a Hopf fibration. Let  be a constant radius of the inner coil. One set of solutions is given by:

This is a solution in a non-viscous gas (compressible fluid) whose density, velocities and pressure goes to zero far from the origin. (Note this is not a solution to the Clay Millennium problem because that refers to incompressible fluids where  is a constant, and neither does it deal with the uniqueness of the Navier–Stokes equations with respect to any turbulence properties.) It is also worth pointing out that the components of the velocity vector are exactly those from the Pythagorean quadruple parametrization. Other choices of density and pressure are possible with the same velocity field:

Viscous three-dimensional periodic solutions
Two examples of periodic fully-three-dimensional viscous solutions are described in.
These solutions are defined on a three-dimensional torus  and are characterized by positive and negative helicity respectively.
The solution with positive helicity is given by:

These solutions can be regarded as a generalization in three dimensions of the classic two-dimensional Taylor-Green Taylor–Green vortex.

Wyld diagrams
Wyld diagrams are bookkeeping graphs that correspond to the Navier–Stokes equations via a perturbation expansion of the fundamental continuum mechanics. Similar to the Feynman diagrams in quantum field theory, these diagrams are an extension of Keldysh's technique for nonequilibrium processes in fluid dynamics. In other words, these diagrams assign graphs to the (often) turbulent phenomena in turbulent fluids by allowing correlated and interacting fluid particles to obey stochastic processes associated to pseudo-random functions in probability distributions.

Representations in 3D

A 2022 paper provides a less costly, dynamical and recurrent solution of the Navier-Stokes equation for 3D turbulent fluid flows. On suitably short time scales, the dynamics of turbulence is deterministic.

Cartesian coordinates

The continuity equation reads:

When the flow is incompressible,  does not change for any fluid particle, and its material derivative vanishes: . The continuity equation is reduced to:

Thus, for the incompressible version of the Navier–Stokes equation the second part of the viscous terms fall away (see Incompressible flow).

This system of four equations comprises the most commonly used and studied form. Though comparatively more compact than other representations, this is still a nonlinear system of partial differential equations for which solutions are difficult to obtain.

Cylindrical coordinates

The gravity components will generally not be constants, however for most applications either the coordinates are chosen so that the gravity components are constant or else it is assumed that gravity is counteracted by a pressure field (for example, flow in horizontal pipe is treated normally without gravity and without a vertical pressure gradient). The continuity equation is:

This cylindrical representation of the incompressible Navier–Stokes equations is the second most commonly seen (the first being Cartesian above). Cylindrical coordinates are chosen to take advantage of symmetry, so that a velocity component can disappear. A very common case is axisymmetric flow with the assumption of no tangential velocity, and the remaining quantities are independent of :

Spherical coordinates

Mass continuity will read:

These equations could be (slightly) compacted by, for example, factoring  from the viscous terms. However, doing so would undesirably alter the structure of the Laplacian and other quantities.

Navier–Stokes equations use in games
The Navier–Stokes equations are used extensively in video games in order to model a wide variety of natural phenomena. Simulations of small-scale gaseous fluids, such as fire and smoke, are often based on the seminal paper "Real-Time Fluid Dynamics for Games" by Jos Stam, which elaborates one of the methods proposed in Stam's earlier, more famous paper "Stable Fluids" from 1999. Stam proposes stable fluid simulation using a Navier–Stokes solution method from 1968, coupled with an unconditionally stable semi-Lagrangian advection scheme, as first proposed in 1992.

More recent implementations based upon this work run on the game systems graphics processing unit (GPU) as opposed to the central processing unit (CPU) and achieve a much higher degree of performance.
Many improvements have been proposed to Stam's original work, which suffers inherently from high numerical dissipation in both velocity and mass.

An introduction to interactive fluid simulation can be found in the 2007 ACM SIGGRAPH course, Fluid Simulation for Computer Animation.

See also

Citations

General references

 V. Girault and P. A. Raviart. Finite Element Methods for Navier–Stokes Equations: Theory and Algorithms. Springer Series in Computational Mathematics. Springer-Verlag, 1986.

 Smits, Alexander J. (2014), A Physical Introduction to Fluid Mechanics, Wiley, 
 Temam, Roger (1984): Navier–Stokes Equations: Theory and Numerical Analysis, ACM Chelsea Publishing,

External links
 Simplified derivation of the Navier–Stokes equations
 Three-dimensional unsteady form of the Navier–Stokes equations Glenn Research Center, NASA

Aerodynamics
Computational fluid dynamics
Concepts in physics
Equations of fluid dynamics
Functions of space and time
Partial differential equations
Transport phenomena